Albert Olszewski (born August 26, 1962) is an American orthopedic surgeon and perennial candidate, who served as a Republican member of both the Montana Senate and Montana House of Representatives, also running unsuccessful campaigns for the senate in 2018, governor in 2020, and congress in 2022. In addition, he also was a candidate for lieutenant governor in 2012 on a ticket with Montana transportation director Jim Lynch. He and Lynch lost in all 4 republican primaries.

Early life and education
He graduated from Charles M. Russell High School in 1980. He received a Bachelor of Arts in biology at Carroll College in 1984 and a Doctor of Medicine from University of Washington School of Medicine in 1988. He served for 13 years in the United States Air Force, becoming a surgeon and rising to the rank of major. While a surgeon in the Air Force, he treated soldiers during the Gulf War.

Campaigns

2018 United States Senate election

In 2018, Olszewski sought election to the United States Senate, but he was defeated in the primary election.

2020 Montana gubernatorial election

In 2020, Olszewski selected Kenneth Bogner to be his running mate in his bid to become governor of Montana. The two were defeated in the primary election by Greg Gianforte and Kristen Juras.

2022 congressional election

On July 1, 2021, Olszewski announced his candidacy for Montana's 2nd congressional district, a new seat created after the 2020 United States census, even though the district's boundaries have yet to be drawn.

Electoral history

2014 Montana House of Representatives election

2016 Montana Senate election

2018 United States Senate election

2020 Montana gubernatorial election

References

1962 births
Living people
American orthopedic surgeons
Candidates in the 2018 United States Senate elections
Candidates in the 2020 United States elections
Candidates in the 2022 United States House of Representatives elections
Carroll College (Montana) alumni
University of Washington School of Medicine alumni
Republican Party members of the Montana House of Representatives
Republican Party Montana state senators
People from Great Falls, Montana
Politicians from Kalispell, Montana
United States Air Force Medical Corps officers
United States Air Force personnel of the Gulf War
21st-century American politicians